The year 2020 is the 23nd year in the history of the M-1 Global, a mixed martial arts promotion based in Russia.

List of events

Road to M-1 USA 4

Road to M-1 USA 4 will be a mixed martial arts event held by M-1 Global on January 31, 2020 at the Charles F. Dodge City Center in Pembroke Pines, Florida, United States.

Fight Card

MMA SERIES-10 - WKG & M-1 Online

MMA SERIES-10 - WKG & M-1 Online was a mixed martial arts event held by M-1 Global on July 18, 2020 at the Tinkoff Arena in St. Petersburg, Russia.

Results

M-1 Selection Online - Tournament in Support of Maksim Shugaley

M-1 Selection Online - Tournament in Support of Maksim Shugaley was a mixed martial arts event held by M-1 Global on September 11, 2020 at the Tinkoff Arena in St. Petersburg, Russia.

Results

See also
 2020 in UFC
 2020 in Bellator MMA
 2020 in ONE Championship 
 2020 in Absolute Championship Akhmat
 2020 in Konfrontacja Sztuk Walki
 2020 in RXF

References

External links
M-1global

M-1 Global events
M-1global events
2020 in mixed martial arts
2020 sport-related lists